Ford Hiroshi Konno (born January 1, 1933) is a Japanese–American former competition swimmer, two-time Olympic champion, and former world record-holder in three events.

Konno was born in Honolulu, Hawaii.  He attended McKinley High School in Honolulu, and swam for the McKinley Tigers high school swim team.  He later received an athletic scholarship to attend Ohio State University, where he swam for the Ohio State Buckeyes swimming and diving team in National Collegiate Athletic Association (NCAA) competition.  Konno set world records of 2:03.9 in the 200-meter and 4:26.7 in the 400-meter freestyle during 1954 college meets.

Konno won four medals at the 1952 and 1956 Summer Olympics.  At the 1952 Summer Olympics in Helsinki, Finland, Konno won gold medals in the men's 1,500-meter freestyle and the 4×200-meter freestyle relay.  His time of 18:30:3 in the 1,500 freestyle was a new Olympic record.  He also won a silver medal in the 400-meter freestyle.  Four years later at the 1956 Summer Olympics in Melbourne, Australia, he won a silver in the men's 4×200-meter freestyle relay.

After graduating from Ohio State University, Konno worked as a high school teacher and swimming coach on the island of Kauai, Hawaii, and later became division manager for an equity life insurance company. In 1972 he was inducted into the International Swimming Hall of Fame. Earlier he married a fellow 1952 Olympic medalist Evelyn Kawamoto; they have two daughters.

See also
 List of members of the International Swimming Hall of Fame
 List of Ohio State University people
 List of Olympic medalists in swimming (men)
 World record progression 200 metres freestyle
 World record progression 400 metres freestyle
 World record progression 800 metres freestyle

References

1933 births
Living people
American male freestyle swimmers
American sportspeople of Japanese descent
World record setters in swimming
Ohio State Buckeyes men's swimmers
Olympic gold medalists for the United States in swimming
Olympic silver medalists for the United States in swimming
Swimmers from Honolulu
Swimmers at the 1952 Summer Olympics
Swimmers at the 1956 Summer Olympics
Medalists at the 1956 Summer Olympics
Medalists at the 1952 Summer Olympics
Hawaii people of Japanese descent